Plan B is an unfinished novel published posthumously in America in 1993 by Chester Himes, which is the final volume in the Harlem Cycle. The story is even darker and more nihilistic than the preceding volumes, culminating in a violent revolutionary movement in the streets of  America.

The first edition was published in France, in 1983 (Editions lieu commun), translated by Helène Devaux-Minié.

Plot summary

The story differs somewhat from the other volumes of the cycle in being less a detective story and more a surrealistic tale of a racial apocalypse in America. The story hinges on the efforts of community leader Tomsson Black to stir up racial tension in Harlem in order to force a radical change in race relations. The novel begins as a hardboiled detective story, then, when the characters' revolt begins, transitions to apocalyptic fiction.

Major themes
In an interview, Himes once noted that he had wanted to "depict the violence that is necessary so that the white community will also give it a little thought, because you know, they're going around playing these games. They haven't given any thought to what would happen if the black people would seriously uprise."

Most notably, Plan B features the death of both of the protagonists of the Harlem Cycle. Gravedigger Jones kills Coffin Ed Johnson in a dramatic final scene, before being killed himself by Tomsson Black. Throughout the story, the usually level-headed Gravedigger gets caught up in the revolutionary fervor, while Coffin Ed is uncharacteristically skeptical and calm.

References

Unfinished novels
1993 American novels
Novels by Chester Himes
Novels published posthumously
Novels about race and ethnicity
Novels set in Manhattan
Harlem in fiction
African-American novels
American detective novels